Oregon Undersea Gardens was an underwater aquarium in Newport, Oregon, United States. The tourist attraction opened in 1966, and plans to close were announced in 2019.

See also 

 Oregon Coast Aquarium

References

1966 establishments in Oregon
2019 disestablishments in Oregon
Aquaria in Oregon
Defunct aquaria
Newport, Oregon
Tourist attractions in Lincoln County, Oregon
Zoos disestablished in 2019
Zoos established in 1966